The smc PENTAX-DA* 1:4 300mm ED [IF] SDM is a supertele prime lens for Pentax K-mount. It uses Pentax' silent SDM motor for autofocus on compatible cameras (K10D and K200D upwards), and has Quick Shift Focus to allow manual adjustments in autofocus mode.

Reception 
Photozone reviewed the lens favourably, stating, "in terms of resolution and contrast the lens is able to produce very good results straight from the max. aperture setting" and "mechanical quality of the lens is absolutely exceptional thanks to high quality materials and seals against dust and moisture". Of the ultrasonic autofocus motor, they wrote that it "works like a breeze - it's both fast and almost silent." Overall, they concluded that the lens is "highly desirable lens for sports and wildlife photographers."

ColorFoto wrote the lens had outstanding sharpness over the entire frame, even wide open, and PopPhoto.com said that "images shot in the field were satisfyingly contrasty and sharp."

References

SMC Pentax-DA Star 300mm F4 ED(IF) SDM at Ricoh Imaging Americas Corp.

External links

300